The Vice Chief of the Air Staff is a senior assistant to the Chief of the Air Staff in several air forces.  These include:

Vice Chief of the Air Staff (India)
Vice Chief of the Air Staff (Pakistan)
Vice Chief of the Air Staff (United Kingdom)